House (acronym for Haskell User's Operating System and Environment) is an experimental open source operating system written in Haskell. It was written to explore system programming in a functional programming language.

It includes a graphical user interface, several demos, and its network protocol stack provides basic support for Ethernet, IPv4, ARP, DHCP, ICMP (ping), UDP, TFTP, and TCP.

References

External links
 House, official home page
 A Principled Approach to Operating System Construction in Haskell, technical paper on House details

Free software operating systems
Free software programmed in Haskell
Software using the BSD license